Lenny Hewlett is an Antiguan professional football manager.

Career
Since May 2013 he coached the Montserrat national football team.

References

External links
Profile at Soccerway.com
Profile at Soccerpunter.com

Year of birth missing (living people)
Living people
Montserratian football managers
Montserrat national football team managers
Place of birth missing (living people)